Mecox is a collection of eight emporiums selling a variety of antiques, indoor and outdoor furniture, home decor, garden ornaments and accessories.  They are known for a large selection of unusual antiques, and an eponymous label of home furnishings both online and in-store. The flagship emporium opened in the village of Southampton, New York on Long Island in the spring of 1996. It sits on three acres of property, previously inhabited by a local garden center. The Southampton, New York store is unique for its extensive garden area filled with outdoor furnishings, plants, and garden ornaments. There are now Mecox stores in Manhattan, West Palm Beach, Los Angeles, Napa, Pittsburgh, Dallas and Houston.

History 
Mecox was founded in 1996 by William McDowell Hoak (or Mac Hoak) after a seven-year career at Morgan Stanley and ten years of experience in corporate commercial real estate. He cites his passion for antiques, design, and fine furniture as the motivation behind combining his business knowledge and avocation to open the first Mecox location. The name Mecox originates with the Shinnecock Indians. The Shinnecock Indians had a small settlement they called Mecox, meaning flat or plain country, in what is now Southampton. In 1640, eight settlers including Edward Howell came to Long Island from Boston. Howell built a mill along the Mecox Bay—the bay for which the furniture store was named.

In the years following 1996, Mecox expanded to open their seven subsequent locations across the country. The New York City location, on Lexington Avenue on Manhattan's Upper East Side began as a pop-up store and became a permanent location soon after. Subsequently, each of the other Mecox furniture emporiums opened.

Products
Hoak and his team of buyers make multiple trips each year to country fairs abroad and other venues around the world from which they source many of their antiques, home furnishings, art, and other products. Mecox also partners with local craftsman, allowing customers to commission their own pieces either from redesigns of Mecox products or completely original designs. Mecox is unique in that they update their offers both online and at each individual location weekly, often tailoring furnishings and other products to the respective season or design trend of the moment.

Their list of online collections includes: Antiques, 100 Newest Products, Furniture, Décor + Art, and Custom.  Mecox has been featured in The New York Times, Architectural Digest, Coastal Living, Elle Decor, and other design related publications. In the spring of 2017, Mecox launched its first exclusive furniture line, The Mecox Collection, focusing on woven rattan, wood and rope designs.

References

External links

Companies established in 1996
Retail companies of the United States